Transporter 3 (French: Le Transporteur 3) is a 2008 English-language French action-thriller film. It is the third and final installment in the original trilogy of the Transporter franchise. Both Jason Statham and François Berléand reprise their roles, as Frank Martin and Inspector Tarconi, respectively. The first film in the series to be directed by Olivier Megaton, it continues the story of Frank Martin, a professional "transporter" who has returned to France to continue his low-key business of delivering packages without question. It grossed over $109 million, making it the highest-grossing film in the trilogy.

Plot
Frank Martin, having returned from Miami to the French Riviera, is unsuccessfully fishing with his friend, Inspector Tarconi when Tarconi receives a call about a black Audi A8 that sped past French customs and evaded the police in a car chase. While Tarconi returns to headquarters to give Frank's alibi, in Odessa, Ukraine, the Environmental Agency Minister, Leonid Tomilenko, receives a threat from corrupt Ecocorp official Jonas Johnson to reopen business negotiations.

At night, the Audi crashes into Frank's home, with a wounded transporter, Malcolm Melville, whom Frank had referred when he declined a previous job. As paramedics take away Malcolm, Frank discovers a woman in the back seat of the Audi who warns him not to take her from the car – she shows him a metal bracelet she and Malcolm have been wearing which explodes if it gets too far from the vehicle. Frank rushes outside, but the ambulance, getting out of range, explodes and  kills Malcolm. Frank is then knocked out by one of Johnson's henchmen.

Johnson places an explosive bracelet on Frank, forcing him to take a package and the woman, Valentina, to Budapest. Tomilenko negotiates to postpone signing Ecocorp's agreement that would allow the ship with the chemicals into his country. While Tarconi researches into Johnson's motivations, Frank goes off-course, visiting a garage to try to deal with the bracelet, but as he fends off Johnson's men, his mechanic friend Otto cannot disarm the device on the car. In Budapest, Johnson tells Frank that he's fired. One of Johnson's men steals the Audi with Valentina inside, leaving Frank to chase him down by bicycle and retrieve them both.

After Frank and Johnson agree to call it even, Johnson sends him to Bucharest, but Frank and Valentina are chased by a black Mercedes-Benz E-Class driven by Tomilenko's agents. After opening the package in the trunk, Frank realizes Valentina is the real package. She then seduces Frank by holding his car keys, resulting in them having sex. Valentina, who is revealed to be Tomilenko's daughter, explains that she was drugged in Ibiza and was transported by Malcolm in order for Johnson to blackmail her father.

Johnson redirects him to Odessa, where he and his men surround them on a bridge. Although Valentina is delivered to Johnson and her bracelet removed, Johnson's men shoot at Frank's car. Frank drives off the bridge into the lake, fooling Johnson into believing that he is dead, but survives by using the air from the car's tires to inflate a buoying device. Aboard the train, Johnson lets Tomilenko talk to Valentina and gives him 15 minutes to sign the contract. After Tarconi and the Ukrainian police retrieve Frank and the Audi, Frank continues his chase and jumps the car on top of the train containing Johnson and his men. He takes out all of Johnson's men but cannot attack Johnson because he is too far from his car.

After Johnson separates the train cabs, Frank jumps his car into the cab, and beats Johnson, strapping him with the bracelet and sending his car, which Johnson is restrained to, into reverse. Johnson breaks free, but is inevitably blown into pieces inside of the cab; Frank reunites with and kisses Valentina in the rubble. Upon hearing from Tarconi that Valentina is safe, Tomilenko tears up the Ecocorp contracts before heading for his business conference. The cargo ship is raided by police and sent away from Ukrainian shores.
Frank and Tarconi return to fishing in Marseilles, still unsuccessful. Valentina, who is in the boat with them, suggests they eat out at a nearby restaurant instead.

Cast
 Jason Statham as Frank Martin
 Natalya Rudakova as Valentina Tomilenko
 François Berléand as Inspector Tarconi
 Robert Knepper as Jonas Johnson
 Jeroen Krabbé as Leonid Tomilenko
 Alex Kobold as Leonid's Aide
 Katia Tchenko as Leonid's Secretary
 David Atrakchi as Malcom Manville
  as Flag
 Eriq Ebouaney as Ice
 David Kammenos as Driver Market
  as Mighty Joe
 Oscar Relier as Thug / Driver
 Timo Dierkes as Otto
 Igor Koumpan as Ukrainian cop
 Paul Barrett as Captain
 Elef Zack as Mate
 Michel Neugarten as Assassin Driver – Sergei
 Farid Elquardi as Yuri

 Semmy Schilt as the Giant

Production
Natalya Rudakova was spotted by Luc Besson on the street as she hurried to her job at a New York City hair salon. He paid for 25 acting lessons over a six-month period, and brought her to audition in Paris, before she received the role. Roger Ebert noted the rarity of leading ladies who are heavily freckled.

Shooting was initially expected to last for 16 weeks, in France. It was also filmed in Odessa, Ukraine.

Release
Unlike its predecessors, Transporter 3 was released by Lionsgate Films instead of 20th Century Fox in the United States. On its opening weekend, the film opened at number 7 with $12 million. The film grossed $31.7 million in the United States and in Canada and $77.3 million in other countries, for a total gross of $109 million worldwide, making it the highest-grossing film in the Transporter trilogy. Transporter 3 was released on DVD and Blu-ray Disc on March 10, 2009 in the United States. 1,108,030 units were sold, bringing in $19.7 million in revenue. Icon Films picked up the rights to distribute the film in the UK and Australia.

Reception
The site's critical consensus states: "This middling installment in the Transporter franchise is a few steps down from its predecessors, featuring generic stunts and a lack of energy." On Metacritic, it has an average score of 51 out of 100, based on 26 critics, indicating "mixed or average reviews". Audiences polled by CinemaScore gave the film an average grade of "B-" on an A+ to F scale.

Roger Ebert gave praise to Megaton's direction for sidestepping the shaky cam for more stable visuals and found Statham to be a "splendid action hero," calling it "a perfectly acceptable brainless action thriller, inspiring us to give a lot of thought to complex sequences we would have been better off sucking on as eye candy." Entertainment Weeklys Lisa Schwarzbaum rated the film a B grade, noting how the plot is similar to previous efforts but said it "makes good on its formula with no pretensions." Marc Savlov of The Austin Chronicle said, "Transporter 3 is terrifically stupid fun, in the very best (or worst, depending on your tolerance for this sort of thing) sense." The A.V. Clubs Scott Tobias said the movie falls short of the standards set by the first two Transporter films but gave praise to the "Speed-like bracelet gimmick" for delivering on the action scenes and the decent chemistry between Statham and Rudakova, concluding that: "It's enough to pass the time, but just barely." Mike Mayo of The Washington Post called it "the best of the unapologetically ridiculous series", pointing out the "hyperactive editing" in the cartoonish vehicular stunts and fight scenes, concluding that: "Overall, the production has the polish and pace that producer/co-writer Luc Besson's work is known for. Any complaints about the lack of substance are pointless."

Jim Vejvoda of IGN wrote that: "Transporter 3 gets some points for a few cleverly handled action sequences, but the romantic subplot and nods to Crank ultimately undermine the film." Norman Wilner of NOW criticized the premise for lacking the "nice balance between car stunts and gymnastic punch-ups" from previous films and forcing Statham to perform more driving scenes than hand-to-hand combat ones, concluding that: "It's not the best use of his talents." Jeremiah Kipp of Slant Magazine was critical of the filmmakers utilizing the "ultra-slick, sexy-sheen, redundant style of car commercials" for their overall visual aesthetic and Statham's dry humor coming across like Sean Connery's James Bond in Goldfinger. Peter Howell of the Toronto Star criticized the overall plot structure and monotonous pacing for betraying the film's "action status," saying: "You know a series is in trouble when it begins mocking its own premise." James Berardinelli called it "the most frustrating entry into a series that has never set the bar terribly high", commending Statham and the fight scenes he's in but was critical of the nonsensical plot trying to fit in with the action scenes and the car chases coming across as "empty amusement", concluding that: "Transporter 3 is proof that brain-dead action movies can be found in theaters during Oscar season as well as during the summer. Fans of the first two Transporter films will likely find this one diverting, although it is a step in the wrong direction. Others will wonder how a movie this disjointed and poorly scripted could get made."

Rudakova's performance was generally derided by critics. Berardinelli commended her sexual appeal, despite not being "conventionally attractive" for the role, but felt her English delivery came off like "phonetic readings." Vejvoda called it "one of the most grating film debuts of all time," criticizing her romantic scenes opposite Statham as not "particularly charming or sexy." Conversely, Ebert said that "Rudakova is no Bonnie Hunt when it comes to personality. She skulks, pouts, clams up, looks out the window, and yet falls in love with the Transporter. Some perfectionists will no doubt criticize her acting. I say the hell with her acting. Look at those freckles. I can never get enough of freckles." Peter Hartlaub of the San Francisco Chronicle found her to be the "perfect woman" for the film, pointing out her "Dennis the Menace freckles, red hair and semi-crazy behavior," and lacking the "plastic hotness of your primped-up Bond girl."

References

External links
 
 

2008 films
2008 action thriller films
2000s chase films
2000s French films
English-language French films
EuropaCorp films
Films about automobiles
Films directed by Olivier Megaton
Films produced by Luc Besson
Films set in Budapest
Films set in Germany
Films set in Marseille
Films set in Romania
Films set in Ukraine
Films shot in Budapest
Films shot in France
Films shot in Hungary
Films shot in Romania
Films shot in Ukraine
Films with screenplays by Luc Besson
Films with screenplays by Robert Mark Kamen
French action thriller films
French sequel films
Lionsgate films
Transporter (franchise)